Labinsky (masculine), Labinskaya (feminine), or Labinskoye (neuter) may refer to:

People
Andrey Labinsky (1871–1941), Russian/Soviet tenor
Numa Labinsky, one of the founders of Nimbus Records, a British record company

Fictional characters
Countess Labinsky, a character in the movie Moonraker played by Catherine Serre

Places
Labinsky District, a district of Krasnodar Krai, Russia
Labinskoye Urban Settlement, a municipal formation which the Town of Labinsk in Krasnodar Krai, Russia is incorporated as
Labinskaya, name of the town of Labinsk in Krasnodar Krai, Russia until 1947

See also
Ust-Labinsky (disambiguation)